Photo District News (or PDN) was an American monthly trade publication for professional photographers. PDN was first published in 1980. The publication took its name from New York City's photo district, an area of photo businesses that was once located in Flatiron District. Its closure was announced on 28 January 2020.

Time has described PDN's annual list of "30 New and Emerging Photographers" as "the go-to outlet to discover up-and-coming photographers, determined on the basis of creativity, versatility and distinctive vision", and as "a career turning point" for those included on the list.

History
Originally named New York Photo District News, PDN was founded by Carl S. Pugh, who was working as a photographer's assistant and sought more freelance work. He inquired as to the best way to advertise his services and was told to post a note on the community bulletin boards found at local businesses frequented by professional photographers. This sparked the idea to create a newsletter for the loose-knit community of professional photographers who populated the inexpensive loft spaces along lower Fifth Avenue (the "Photo District"). PDN was owned by Emerald Expositions and headquartered in New York.

The first issue (May 1980) cost $800 to print and carried $2,000 in advertising, yielding a tidy profit. It was distributed free in stores in the Photo District. PDN was an instant success. In time professional photographers, coming to Manhattan on assignment from elsewhere in the country picked up a copy and requested a subscription (initially $6 per year), which, in turn, was seen by other photographers back home. In this manner, PDN quickly grew into a national publication.

In 1983, PDN launched Photo Expo, a trade show for the same market, which remains the leading US show for pro shooters (since renamed PHOTOPLUS). Pugh sold PDN and the show to Adweek in 1984.

It was announced on 28 January 2020 that the print publication would cease, and the website would no longer be updated. The future of PDN Annual and PDN's 30 have yet to be determined.

References

External links

Defunct magazines published in the United States
Magazines disestablished in 2020
Magazines established in 1980
Magazines published in New York City
Monthly magazines published in the United States
Photography magazines
Photography in the United States
Professional and trade magazines
Visual arts magazines published in the United States